Portuguese Sign language is a sign language used mainly by deaf people in Portugal.

It is recognized in the present Constitution of Portugal. It was significantly influenced by Swedish Sign Language, through a school for the Deaf that was established in Lisbon by Swedish educator Pär Aron Borg.

See also
Portuguese manual alphabet

References

External links

Swedish Sign Language family
Languages of Portugal